Sun Zhenni (born May 5, 2000 in Shanghai, China) is a Chinese singer and actress. She is a member of Team HII of the Chinese idol group SNH48, as well as its sub-units, Color Girls and Style-7.

Early life
Sun was born on May 5, 2000 in the Hongkou District of Shanghai, China.  She was introduced to SNH48 by a friend, and successfully auditioned to join the group while still a student at the Shanghai Paddington Bi-Lingual School.

Career
On March 26, 2016, Sun was announced as one of the sixth-generation members of SNH48, and was assigned to Team HII. She debuted during Team HII's third stage, "Idol no Yoake". On July 30, she was ranked 21st during SNH48's third General Election with 20334.1 votes, and was assigned to Under Girls. Meanwhile, she was also announced as one of the remaining two members of SNH48's sub-unit, Color Girls. On November 5, she came in sixth during SNH48's second Fashion Awards. On December 20, she made her first senbatsu appearance on SNH48's 14th EP, "Happy Wonder World".

On January 7, 2017, she participated in SNH48's third Request Time. In June 2017, Sun appeared in the Siba and iQIYI youth drama 见习爱神. On July 29, 2017 during SNH48's fourth General Election, Sun came in 22nd with 28614.6 votes and was assigned to the Under Girls again. In December 2017 she participated in the Tencent audition variety show Star Mermaid for a chance to star in the sequel to Stephen Chow's hit film, "The Mermaid" and won. Filming began later that same year but the project is still pending release.

On July 28, 2018, Sun drastically dropped in rank and fell to 56th place with 14840.56 votes during SNH48's fifth General Election. Fans speculate that the decline was due to her focus on acting and lack of appearance in SNH48 Theater performances. That same year she appeared in the Youku historical fantasy web drama 天意 in a supporting role as 天意. She was also cast in a supporting role in the contemporary youth drama 小夜曲 alongside fellow SNH48 members Huang Tingting and Lin Siyi and Chinese actor Cheney Chen which is expected to air in 2020. She was also cast in the comedy film 日不落酒店 which also has an expected release date of 2020.

At the start of 2019, Sun made a guest appearance as the mermaid in JJ Lin's performance of 那些你很冒险的梦 at the Jiangsu Television New Year's Eve Concert which drew 540 million viewers. That year, Sun decided to enroll in drama school and focused on studying for the National College Entrance Exam. Sun was accepted into China's three most prestigious drama schools; Beijing Film Academy, Central Drama Academy and Shanghai Theatre Academy, the only SNH48 member to achieve this accomplishment. She ultimately enrolled at Shanghai Theater Academy where she ranked 5th in the nation. The focus on her studies led to a lack of appearances in SNH48 Theater performances and her rankings fell again during the sixth elections, this time failing to rank at all. However, she was still able to appear on one of SNH48's main tracks that year Dream in a Summer and was also the MV center. In late 2019, her agency registered a trademark for her name along with fellow SNH48 member Xu Jiaqi, they are only a handful of SNH48 members or alumni who have had their names trademarked including Ju Jingyi and as a result are expected to receive heavy solo promotions in the future.

In 2020, Sun was a trainee contestant in the Tencent girl group survival show Produce Camp 2020 (also known as Chuang 2020) where she had a final ranking of 18 and leaving the show at the end of June 2020. She made a special appearance on the show's finale and performed Ice Cream on stage with Produce Camp mentor, Huang Zitao. On August 15, 2020, Sun was able to rank in SNH48's Top 48 for the first time since 2017 and was 30th with 195,908 votes during SNH48's seventh General Election. She will again be included in the SNH48 Under Girls lineup. During her election speech she expressed an interest to focus on her studies and acting while still participating in SNH48.

Public image
Sun has been called one of the "New Four Dan actresses of the post-00s Generation" along with Zhang ZiFeng, Ouyang Nana, and Wen Qi.

Personal life
Sun is Han Chinese with one-quarter German Jewish ancestry through her paternal grandmother.

Sun is close friends with several SNH48 members including Fei Qinyuan, Dai Meng (Diamond), Xu-Yang Yuzhuo (Eliwa), Zhao Yue (Akira) and Chen Qiannan. She has stated that she is very close to fellow Produce Camp contestants, Zhang Yifan, Liu Meng, and Tian Jingfan. At Shanghai Theater Academy, she is one of a handful of close-knit celebrity student friends along with Idol Producer contestant turned actor Chen Tao, Idol Producer contestant and ONER member Ling Chao and Produce Camp 2019 contestant and R1SE member He Luo Luo.

Discography

With SNH48

EPs

Units

SNH48 Stage Units

Concert units

Filmography

Films

TV series

| 2020 || We Are Blazing || Contestant |}

References

External links
 Official Member Profile 
 

2000 births
Living people
21st-century Chinese actresses
Actresses from Shanghai
Chinese child singers
Chinese Mandopop singers
Chinese people of German-Jewish descent
Chinese television actresses
Singers from Shanghai
SNH48 members